Para table tennis at the 2018 Asian Para Games was held in Jakarta between 6 and 13 October 2018.

Medal table

Medalists

Men

Women

Mixed

See also 
 Table tennis at the 2017 ASEAN Para Games
 Table tennis at the 2018 Asian Games

References

External links 
 RESULT SYSTEM - ASIAN PARA GAMES JAKARTA 2018

2018 Asian Para Games events
Table tennis at the Asian Para Games